On 29 November, at 14:10 UTC, a magnitude 7.7  earthquake struck off the southern coast of Taliabu Island Regency in North Maluku, Indonesia. At least 41 people were killed on the nearby islands and a tsunami was triggered. Several hundred homes, buildings and offices were damaged or destroyed.

Earthquake
According to the Meteorology, Climatology, and Geophysical Agency (BMKG), the earthquake occurred due to shallow strike-slip faulting on the Sorong Fault. The U.S. Geological Survey (USGS) stated that it ruptured along a NNE–SSW striking fault. A finite fault modeled by the USGS indicated that the fault crosses through the middle of Taliabu Island. A maximum slip of  occurred along areas of the fault where it crosses beneath the island. The earthquake had a maximum Modified Mercalli intensity of IX (Violent). Intensity VI (Strong) was felt on nearby Sulawesi. However, the maximum intensity by damage was only VII (Very strong).

Tsunami
Many inhabitants along the coast feared the arrival of a tsunami and evacuated their homes. A tsunami was not confirmed by the BMKG, adding that because the earthquake was of a strike-slip nature, a major tsunami was not expected.

Impact
At least 34 people died, eight were missing and 153 were injured on the islands of Taliabu and Mangole. Many casualties and property damage were caused by landslides. At least 512 houses were destroyed and 760 others were damaged. The earthquake also damaged or destroyed nine churches, 17 schools, 12 mosques and 14 government offices. On the island of Sulawesi, seven people were killed, 18 were injured and there was some damage to buildings in the city of Manado. Most of the fatalities were from Mangole Island, where buildings, homes and mosques, mostly constructed of Timber wood were destroyed or damaged. Landslides also reportedly destroyed a dock.

See also
List of earthquakes in 1998
List of earthquakes in Indonesia

References

External links

1998 earthquakes
Earthquakes in Indonesia
Tsunamis in Indonesia
1998 in Indonesia
North Maluku
1998 tsunamis
Maluku Islands
1998 disasters in Indonesia